Roger Ninféi (30 July 1916 – 28 February 2003) was a Catholic Marianist priest from Moyeuvre-Grande, Lorraine. He was a builder, educator, director of several schools among the largest ones in France. He profoundly developed the Collège Stanislas de Paris and launched the College Sainte-Marie d'Antony.  In 1994, he was appointed Officer of the Légion d'honneur under the ministry of the Nationale Education. He died in Antony, Hauts-de-Seine and is buried in Antony cemetery.

References

1916 births
2003 deaths
20th-century French Roman Catholic priests
Marianists
People from Moselle (department)
Officiers of the Légion d'honneur